Chonelasma is a genus of sea sponge in the family Euretidae.

Species 
According to the World Register of Marine Species, the following species are accepted within Chonelasma:

 Chonelasma australe Reiswig & Kelly, 2011
 Chonelasma biscopulatum Reiswig & Kelly, 2011
 Chonelasma bispinula Kersken, Janussen & Martínez Arbizu, 2019
 Chonelasma chathamense Reiswig & Kelly, 2011
 Chonelasma choanoides Schulze & Kirkpatrick, 1910
 Chonelasma doederleini Schulze, 1886
 Chonelasma glaciale Reiswig & Kelly, 2011
 Chonelasma hamatum Schulze, 1886
 Chonelasma ijimai Topsent, 1901
 Chonelasma lamella Schulze, 1886
 Chonelasma oreia Reiswig, 2014

References

Hexactinellida
Sponge genera